Carla Ruz (born ) is a retired Chilean female volleyball player, playing as a l. She was part of the Chile women's national volleyball team.

She participated in the 2011 Women's Pan-American Volleyball Cup, and the 2013 Summer Universiade.
On club level she played for Universidad Católica in 2011.

References

External links

http://diario.latercera.com/2012/04/15/01/contenido/deportes/4-106443-9-el-gran-triunfo-de-carla-ruz.shtml

1991 births
Living people
Chilean women's volleyball players
Place of birth missing (living people)
Liberos